Sadrabad (also Romanized as Şadrābād; also known as Sadrābād-e Pīshkūh and Sadr Abad Pishkooh) is a village in, and the capital of, Sadrabad Rural District of Nadushan District of Meybod County, Yazd province, Iran. At the 2006 National Census, its population was 396 in 118 households, when it was in Nadushan Rural District of Khezrabad District, Ashkezar County. The following census in 2011 counted 573 people in 167 households.

After the separation of Nadushan Rural District from the county to join Meybod County, Sadrabad became the capital of the newly created Sadrabad Rural District within Nadushan District. The latest census in 2016 showed a population of 509 people in 162 households; it was the largest village in its rural district.

References 

Meybod County

Populated places in Yazd Province

Populated places in Meybod County